Atlanta's Burning Down is the third studio album by Dickey Betts of The Allman Brothers Band. It was recorded with his band Great Southern in late 1977, and released in early 1978. The standout tracks are "Good Time Feeling" and "Atlanta's Burning Down". The title track is a sentimental narrative about a soldier's wife being in Atlanta during the burning of the city, while he was fighting in Virginia. The guest musicians are Bonnie Bramlett, Clydie King and Sherlie Matthews on background vocals.

Critical reception
On AllMusic, Thom Jurek wrote, "On his third solo outing – and his second with his backing band Great Southern – Allman Brothers lead guitarist Dickey Betts moves back into the deep-fried Southern boogie that the Brothers are (in)famous for and serves it up with just a smidgen of country and comes out with another winner.... Loud, tough, and funky, Atlanta's Burning Down is a winner."

Track listing
"Good Time Feeling" (Dickey Betts) - 4:31
"Atlanta's Burning Down" (Billy Ray Reynolds) - 4:33
"Leavin' Me Again" (Betts, Dan Toler) - 4:17
"Back on the Road Again" (Betts) - 4:13
"Dealin' with The Devil" (Betts, Toler, Reynolds) - 3:46
"Shady Streets" (Betts, Toler, Reynolds) - 4:30
"You Can Have Her (I Don't Want Her)" (Willie Cook) - 3:53
"Mr. Blues Man" (Betts, Curtis Buck) - 4:12

Personnel
Great Southern
Dickey Betts - guitar, lead vocals
"Dangerous Dan" Toler - guitar
Michael Workman - keyboards, background vocals
David Goldflies - bass
David Toler - drums, percussion
Donnie Sharbono - drums, percussion, background vocals
Additional musicians
Topper Price - harmonica
Reese Wynans - keyboards in "Atlanta's Burning Down"
Bonnie Bramlett - background vocals
Clydie King - background vocals
Sherlie Matthews - background vocals
Steve Wittmack - string arrangements
Production
Produced by Jack Richardson, Dickey Betts
Recording Engineer: Fred Torchio
Mastering: George Marino
Art Direction: David Richman
Photography: Shayne Fair

References

Dickey Betts albums
1978 albums
Albums produced by Jack Richardson (record producer)
Arista Records albums